Wilson Bombarda (born 7 October 1930) is a Brazilian former basketball player. He competed in the men's tournament at the 1956 Summer Olympics.

References

External links
 

1930 births
Living people
Brazilian men's basketball players
1954 FIBA World Championship players
Olympic basketball players of Brazil
Basketball players at the 1956 Summer Olympics
Basketball players from São Paulo
Medalists at the 1955 Pan American Games
Pan American Games medalists in basketball
Basketball players at the 1955 Pan American Games
Pan American Games bronze medalists for Brazil
People from Lins, São Paulo